Ferebee is the name of several people:

George Ferebee (flourished 1613), English composer
London R. Ferebee (1849 – after 1883), African preacher and author
Thomas Ferebee (1918–2000), American bombardier